The women's points race at the 2010 Dutch National Track Championships in Apeldoorn took place at Omnisport Apeldoorn on December 28, 2010. 17 athletes participated in the contest.

Kirsten Wild won the gold medal, Amy Pieters took silver and Ellen van Dijk won the bronze.

Competition format
There were no qualification rounds for this discipline. Consequently, the event was run direct to the final.

Results

Results from wielerpunt.com.

References

Women's points
Dutch National Track Championships – Women's points race